The Nottoway Archeological Site is an overlapping series of prehistoric Native American settlement sites near the town of Stony Creek in Sussex County, Virginia.  The site, located on a terrace above the Nottoway River, has documented evidence of occupation from c. 9200BCE (the Paleo-Indian period) to c. 1600 (the Late Woodland Period).  Finds at the site have included significantly stratified occupation features such as hearths, as well as large numbers of stone points and hide scrapers.  It was, at the time of its listing in 1988, one of a small number of sites that shed light on Native American occupation of the interior coastal plain in the area.

The site was listed on the National Register of Historic Places in 1988.

See also
National Register of Historic Places listings in Sussex County, Virginia

References

Archaeological sites on the National Register of Historic Places in Virginia
Sussex County, Virginia
National Register of Historic Places in Sussex County, Virginia